The 2019–20 season was Millwall's 135th year in existence, 93rd consecutive season in The Football League, and 43rd in the second tier. Millwall competed in the Championship, FA Cup, and League Cup. Millwall manager Neil Harris resigned ten games into the season, on 3 October 2019. He was in charge of the club for four and a half years. Gary Rowett took over as manager on 21 October. The Championship season was suspended due to the COVID-19 Pandemic on 13 March 2020. After measures were put in place to make playing games safe, such as playing games behind closed doors with no fans, and rounds of testing for players it was decided to restart the season. Millwall resumed against Derby County on 20 June 2020. The season covered the period between 1 July 2019 and 22 July 2020.

Pre-season
On 28 May 2019, The Lions announced their pre-season schedule. A week later a friendly against Spanish side Real Sociedad was confirmed. A training camp in Portugal with a match against Portuguese side SC Braga was also added.

Competitions

Championship

League table

Results by matchday

Result summary

Matches
On Thursday, 20 June 2019, the EFL Championship fixtures were revealed.

FA Cup

The third round draw was made live on BBC Two from Etihad Stadium, Micah Richards and Tony Adams conducted the draw. The fourth round draw was made by Alex Scott and David O'Leary on Monday, 6 January.

EFL Cup

The first round draw was made on 20 June. The second round draw was made on 13 August 2019 following the conclusion of all but one first round matches.

Squad

Statistics

|-
!colspan=14|Players who left the club:

|}

Goals record

Disciplinary record

Transfers

Transfers in

Loans in

Loans out

Transfers out

References

Millwall
Millwall F.C. seasons